
Candelario is a municipality in the province of Salamanca, Castile and León, Spain.

Candelario may also refer to:

Surname
 Alex Candelario (born 1975), American cyclist
 Alexis Candelario Santana (born 1972), Puerto Rican convicted criminal and former leader of a drug cartel
 Claro Candelario, Filipino labor leader
 Felicia Candelario (born 1961), Dominican Republic sprinter
 Guillermina Candelario (born 1979), female weightlifter from the Dominican Republic
 Jeimer Candelario (born 1993), American MLB player
 Kevin Candelario (born 1994), American drag queen 
 Moisés Candelario (born 1978), Ecuadorian footballer

Given name
 Candelario Duvergel (1963–2016), amateur boxer from Cuba
 Candelario Garcia (1944–2013), recipient of the U.S. Medal of Honor
 Candelario Huízar (1882–1970), Mexican composer and music teacher

Places
 Candelario Mancilla, a small settlement in the Aysén Region of southern Chile

See also
 Candelaria (disambiguation)
 

Surnames of Spanish origin